MCC Campus Matriculation Higher Secondary School (MCC Campus School) co-educational which offers education from nursery level Matriculation level that is part of Madras Christian College. The School located in East Tambaram, Chennai, Tamil Nadu, India. The school celebrated its 32nd Anniversary on 6 July 2016 graced by His Excellency Dr. Konijeti Rosaiah  Governor of Tamil Nadu.

History

Beginnings 
MCC Campus School was established in June 1985 with 11 girls and boys as a kindergarten has grown to Higher Secondary. A group of parents in Madras Christian College decide to open a kindergarten class to provide quality education for their children. Dr. Mithra G. Augustine, Principal gives permission and the school is opened as a project of St. Thomas's Hall, located in the annexe. Dr. P. Dayanandan, warden of St. Thomas's Hall makes the Necessary arrangements with his wife Mrs. Anne Dayanandan.

Special Events & Clubs

Events 
 Investiture Ceremony
 Independence Day - 15 August, Flag Hoisting
 Parent Teacher Conference
 Book Fair
 Annual Health Check-up, Vision testing
 Sports Day
 Christmas programme - December
 Republic Day - 26 January, Flag Hoisting
 Special Assemblies
 Overnight Stay - V Std
 Mock Election - V Std
 National Olympiad Examination - NSO, NMO, NCO, NEO
 Spell Bee Competitions
 Green Week - Last Week of January
 Bharat Scouts & Guides
 Cubs & Bulbuls
 Annual day

Clubs 
 Science Club - Scintillation
 English Club - The Elite
 Tamil Club - Senthamil Solai
 Math Club - GeoMath
 Health Club
 Social Science Club.- Manasarovar              
 Space and Rocketry club - Cosmic Super Novas

References

External links
 Official School Website
 MCC College website

High schools and secondary schools in Chennai